Is this music? is an alternative music magazine based in Scotland, with a  focus on the Scottish alternative music scene. Its first issue appeared in late 2003, featuring news of Bob Fairfoull's split from Idlewild, but its best known 'exclusive' was the first ever interview with Glasgow-based pop superstars Franz Ferdinand.

Since then, the magazine has continued to feature the best of Scottish alternative, with articles on groups like Belle and Sebastian, Sons and Daughters, Snow Patrol, King Creosote and the Beta Band featuring on the cover as well as on the free covermount CD which has become a popular summary of the best new sounds coming out of Scotland.  In 2006 their website was redesigned to incorporate many reviews and features not present in the paper version of the magazine.

is this music? gets its name from the song featured on Teenage Fanclub's album Bandwagonesque.

External links
 Official website
 Catalogue of releases

Alternative magazines
Music magazines published in the United Kingdom
Magazines established in 2003
Magazines published in Scotland